Phinney is a surname. Notable people with the surname include:

Archie Phinney (1904–1949), Nez Perce anthropologist
Connie Carpenter-Phinney (born 1957), American racing cyclist and speed skater, married to Davis, mother of Taylor
David Phinney, American journalist and broadcaster 
Davis Phinney (born 1959), American racing cyclist, married to Connie, father of Taylor
Elihu Phinney (1755–1813), American printer
Guy Carleton Phinney (1851–1893), American real estate developer
Leslie Phinney, American thermal engineer
Taylor Phinney (born 1990), American racing cyclist, son of Connie and Davis

See also
Phinney Ridge, Seattle, Washington
Finney, a surname
Finnie, a surname